Nguyễn Xuân Phúc (born 20 July 1954) is a Vietnamese politician who served as the 10th President of Vietnam from 2021 until his resignation in 2023 amidst a series of corruption scandals.

After serving five years as Prime Minister of Vietnam (2016–2021), where he oversaw a period of record economic growth and directed the country's response to the COVID-19 pandemic, he was elected to the presidency by the National Assembly of Vietnam on 5 April 2021. As President, Phúc was the second highest official in Vietnam behind Nguyễn Phú Trọng, the General Secretary of the Communist Party, and was ranked 2nd in the Party's 13th Politburo. Phúc is also a full member of the National Assembly, serving in its 11th, 12th, 13th and 14th terms. 

Phúc became a member of the Communist Party of Vietnam on 12 November 1983. He studied at the Hanoi National Economic University in economic management between 1973 and 1978, after which he studied administrative management at the Vietnam National Administrative Academy. From 1978 to 1979 he was employed by Quảng Nam-Đà Nẵng Economic Board. From 1980 to 1993, Phúc worked initially as a civil servant, before rising to become the deputy head of Quảng Nam-Đà Nẵng's People's Committee. Phúc then served in various roles including that of provincial president, director of government offices, before becoming deputy prime minister (2011–2016). His popularity has plummeted, due to growing allegations of corruption, with which he and his family are believed to be involved.

Early life
Phúc was born on 20 July 1954, in the commune of Quế Phú, district of Quế Sơn, Quảng Nam Province, in what was then the State of Vietnam. He took economic management at Hanoi National Economic University from 1973 to 1978. He was accepted to join the Communist Party of Vietnam on 12 May 1982, officially becoming a member of this party on 12 November 1983.
From 1978 to 1979 he was among personnel at the Quảng Nam-Đà Nẵng Economic Board. From 1980 to 1993: Phúc was an employee, then deputy, rising to Chief of Office of the Quảng Nam – Đà Nẵng People's Committee. He studied administrative management at the Vietnam National Administrative Academy.

His father Nguyễn Hiền was born in 1918, and worked for the Democratic Republic of Vietnam before 1954, heading north in accordance with the Geneva Accord. He, his mother and siblings stayed in their hometown, where they studied at the village school. His mother and siblings secretly worked for the National Front for the Liberation of South Vietnam, and his sister was killed by the US military and the South Vietnamese government after a battle in 1965. In 1966, his mother was also killed. He lived with his sister in his hometown for a while, then was secretly brought to the North by the comrades of his parents in 1967.

Education
Phúc attended junior high school in his hometown of Quang Nam, Da Nang. In the period 1966 - 1968, he went to the Revolutionary War Zone and was trained by the Party in the North. He attended high school and was also the Secretary of the High School Youth Union from 1968 to 1972, graduating from general education on October 10, 1972.

From 1973, he moved to Hanoi, studied at the National Economics University, participated in activities in the Youth Union movement, and served as Secretary of the Union. In 1978, he graduated with a Bachelor of Economics from Hanoi National Economics University with a foreign language certificate in English B, Russian Literature B.  In the 1990s, he studied State Administration. at the National Academy of Public Administration . In 1996, he was sent to study Economic Management at the National University of Singapore.

On May 12, 1982, he was admitted to the Communist Party of Vietnam, though the official date is November 12, 1983.

Political career

Early career 
From 1993–1996:  Phúc was the Director of Department of Planning and Investment of Quang Nam-Da Nang Province. He studied economic management at the National University of Singapore.

From 1997 to 2001, Phúc was a permanent member of the Provincial party committee (17th, 18th session); Vice Chairman, then the first Vice Chairman of the provincial People's Committee of Quang Nam Province and Director of Industrial Zones Management Board of Quang Nam Province. He was a member of the provincial People's Council (6th session).

From 2001–2004: Vice Secretary of provincial party committee of Quang Nam Province, Chairman of the People's Committee of Quang Nam Province (term from 1999 – 2004). He was a member of Vietnam's National Assembly (11th session), head of Quang Nam Province's members of the National Assembly, and a member of the Committee for Economy and Budget of the National Assembly (11th session).

Entering national politics 
In March 2006, he was appointed Deputy Chief Inspector of the Government. At the 10th National Party Congress, the party elected him to the Central Committee of the Communist Party of Vietnam. In June 2006, he was appointed as Deputy Secretary of the Party Committee, Deputy Chairman of the Government Office. In August 2007, he was approved by the National Assembly as Minister of the Government of Vietnam.

From June 2006 to August 2007, Phúc was Permanent Vice Minister of the Office of Government, member of the 11th National Assembly's Economic and Budgetary Commission.

From August 2007 to January 2011, Phúc was Minister of the Office of Government, Head of the Prime Minister's Task Force for Administrative Procedure Reform.

From January 2011 to July 2011, Phúc was Member of the Politburo of the 11th CPV Central Committee, Minister of the Office of Government.

From 2 August 2011 to 7 April 2016, Phúc was the Deputy Prime Minister of Vietnam.

Premiership 
On 7 April 2016, Phúc became the Prime Minister of the Socialist Republic of Vietnam at the 11th working session of the 13th National Assembly. During his tenure, he has been praised for overseeing Vietnam's successful response to the ongoing COVID-19 pandemic.

In the 2016-2021 period, Prime Minister Nguyễn Xuân Phúc leads the Government of Vietnam, facing many major events of the country, including the dynamics of socio-economic development, natural disasters, epidemics and epidemics.  general problems of the country.

On 31 January 2021 Phúc was re-elected by the 13th Party Central Committee.

Covid-19 pandemic 

Late 2019 – early 2020, COVID-19 pandemic broke out from China and spread to the world.  In Vietnam, the anti-epidemic policy is set and resolutely implemented.  Prime Minister Nguyễn Xuân Phúc leads the joint, assigns Deputy Prime Minister Vũ Đức Đam to direct. He instructed all people to stay at home, only going out in cases of absolute necessity such as buying food, food, medicine, emergency, working at factories, production facilities, and business establishments.  business services, essential goods are not closed, stop operating and other emergencies;  strictly implement the minimum distance of 2.0 m when communicating;  do not gather more than two people outside of offices, schools, hospitals and in public places.

As for measures to support people, on April 9, 2020, Prime Minister Nguyễn Xuân Phúc issued a resolution on measures to support people facing difficulties due to the Covid-19 pandemic to share difficulties,  ensure the lives of people and workers nationwide, contributing to social stability.

Presidency 
On 5 April 2021, Phúc was elected the 10th President of Vietnam, during a meeting session of the National Assembly, succeeding Nguyễn Phú Trọng who had previously announced his resignation from the role. He was the only nominated candidate for the role, the first incumbent Prime Minister to be elected President by the National Assembly, and the first Prime Minister to be elected President since Ho Chi Minh in 1945.

On 30 August 2022, he became the President of the Vietnam Red Cross Society

Visit to Russia

Accompanying him and his wife was a high-ranking Vietnamese delegation who arrived at Vnukovo airport in the Russian capital Moscow, starting an official visit Russia from 29 November to 2 December, at the invitation of President Vladimir Putin.

The purpose of the visit is to strengthen cooperation between the two countries in the prevention of the Covid-19 pandemic, especially research and production of vaccines and medicines, and sharing of experience in disease prevention.

In the following Joint Statement, the two sides affirmed their determination to further strengthen the relations Vietnam-Russia comprehensive strategic partnership by 2030, considering the Consolidating strategic trust is the foundation for further expansion and strengthening of bilateral cooperation in all fields. According to Vietnamese Ambassador to the Russian Federation Dang Minh Khoi, the time of talks between Mr. Nguyen Xuan Phuc and Mr. Putin lasting nearly 4 hours is rare in similar events of the Russian President.

Resignation 
On 17 January 2023, he resigned as President of Vietnam and retired from politics, taking responsibility for "wrongdoings and violations" by 539 subordinates in his government amidst a crackdown on corruption, which included the dismissal of two Deputy Prime Ministers and the arrest of the Minister of Health Nguyễn Thanh Long. In its statement on his resignation, the Vietnamese government evaluated him positively. 

Even though he is responsible for the wrongdoing of his officials, he denied any conspiracy theories suspecting and claiming that he or his family was directly engaged in or associated with the COVID-19-related Việt Á scandal.

Personal life
His wife is Trần Thị Nguyệt Thu. He has two children, a daughter named Nguyễn Thị Xuân Trang (b. 1986, married to Vũ Chí Hùng in 2009) and a son named Nguyễn Xuân Hiếu. His son-in-law Hùng is the incumbent Vice Director General of the General Department of Taxation.

He has a brother named Nguyễn Quốc Dũng, born in 1947, who is the former Procurator General of the People's Procuracy of Da Nang. He had a living sister named Nguyễn Thị Thuyền (born after Dũng in 1952) and another sister who was shot by American soldiers during the Vietnam War.

Award
  Order of José Martí (Cuba, 19 September 2021)

Notes

References

External links 

1954 births
Prime Ministers of Vietnam
Deputy Prime Ministers of Vietnam
Living people
Members of the 11th Politburo of the Communist Party of Vietnam
Members of the 12th Politburo of the Communist Party of Vietnam
Members of the 13th Politburo of the Communist Party of Vietnam
Members of the 10th Central Committee of the Communist Party of Vietnam
Members of the 11th Central Committee of the Communist Party of Vietnam
Members of the 12th Central Committee of the Communist Party of Vietnam
Members of the 13th Central Committee of the Communist Party of Vietnam
People from Quảng Nam province
Presidents of Vietnam